Fred Atkinson was an American Director of Education in the Philippines from 1900 up to 1902. During his time, he gave emphasis in providing Filipinos with vocational training.

References 

American educators
Year of death missing
Year of birth missing